The Sky Muster satellites are two geostationary (GEO) communications satellites operated by NBN Co Limited and built by SSL. They were launched in 2015 and 2016 to provide fast broadband in areas where NBN didn't want to either lay fiber or install enough wireless antennas and offshore. They provide download speeds of up to 100 Mbit/s, and upload speeds of 5 Mbit/s in a best-case scenario.

Each Sky Muster has 101 spot beams, which are focused satellite signals which are specially concentrated in power and cover a specific geographic area. The electromagnetic Ka band spot beams are used to carry information from the end users' equipment on the ground to the satellites. Each satellite offers 80 gigabits per second of bandwidth. The two satellites will provide high-speed broadband service to 400,000 Australian homes and businesses in rural and remote Australia. The two satellites were designed to provide service for at least 15 years.

Sky Muster I (NBN-Co 1A) was launched on 1 October 2015 from the Guiana Space Centre in French Guiana, South America, alongside Argentina's ARSAT-2, on an Ariane 5ECA rocket.

Sky Muster I operates in geostationary orbit of 140° East. Sky Muster I became operational in April 2016.

Sky Muster II (NBN-Co 1B) was launched on 5 October 2016, and operates in geostationary orbit of 145° East.

Initial services were offered on the service to end users commencing in January, 2016.

As of June 2020, there are over 100,000 active customers connected to a Sky Muster service, with the largest single Retail Service Provider of Sky Muster services being Activ8me with over 35,000 active Sky Muster connections.

Background
The two NBN satellites, Sky Muster (NBN-Co 1A) and Sky Muster II (NBN-Co 1B), were conceived in 2012 under the Gillard Labor government, as part of the original National Broadband Network scheme and NBN Co contracted Space Systems/Loral (SSL) to build and launch the two satellites as part of a total investment costing . The launch was conducted in accordance with the Space Activities Act 1998, which requires Ministerial approval for the launch of a space object from Australia or the launch of a space object by an Australian entity from an overseas location.

Bailey Brooks, a six-year old School of the Air student who lives on a cattle station  from Alice Springs, won a competition to draw a picture of how the satellite benefits rural Australians. Her drawing of the rocket was printed on the payload fairing, and her class named NBN-Co 1A "Sky Muster" as it would bring Australians together like a cattle muster.

References

External links

 Sky Muster Launch
 Satellite FAQ: Everything you need to know about Sky Muster

Satellites of Australia
Spacecraft launched in 2015
2015 in Australia